One More Time is a 1970 American comedy film directed by Jerry Lewis and starring Sammy Davis Jr. and Peter Lawford. It was filmed in 1969 and released in May, 1970 by United Artists. It is a sequel to the 1968 film Salt and Pepper.

Plot
Chris Pepper and Charlie Salt lose their nightclub and turn to Pepper's aristocratic twin brother for help. He refuses to help them, and is then found murdered. Pepper assumes his identity, and soon discovers that he was a diamond smuggler, and was murdered by his accomplices. Salt and Pepper band together to put the criminals behind bars.

Cast
Sammy Davis Jr. as Charles Salt
Peter Lawford as Christopher Pepper / Lord Sydney Pepper
Maggie Wright as Miss Tomkins
Ester Anderson as Billie
John Wood as Figg
Dudley Sutton as Wilson
Percy Herbert as Mander
Anthony Nicholls as Candler
Allan Cuthbertson as Belton
Edward Evans as Gordon
Leslie Sands as Inspector Glock
Glyn Owen as Dennis
Peter Cushing as Baron Frankenstein
Christopher Lee as The Vampire
Jerry Lewis as Bandleader (voice)

Production
One More Time is the only film that Jerry Lewis directed in which he did not star, although he does have a role as the off-screen voice of the bandleader.

Home media
The film was released on DVD on January 25, 2005.

Novelization
Slightly before the release of the film, per the era's customary timing, a novelization of the screenplay was released by Popular Library. The author was Michael Avallone.

See also
 List of American films of 1970

References

External links

 

1970 films
1970s buddy comedy films
American buddy comedy films
Films directed by Jerry Lewis
United Artists films
Films set in London
1970 comedy films
1970s English-language films
1970s American films